Drepanepteryx is a genus of insects belonging to the family Hemerobiidae.

The species of this genus are found in Eurasia.

Species:
 Drepanepteryx algida (Erichson, 1851)
 Drepanepteryx calida (Krüger, 1922)

References

Hemerobiiformia
Neuroptera genera